Gowan may refer to:

People
Charles Gowan (1850–1938)
David Gowan, American politician from Arizona
Franklin B. Gowen (1836–1889), attorney, president of Reading Railroad
Geoffrey Gowan (1929–2013), Canadian sports broadcaster
Hunter Gowan, Irish Protestant politician and militiaman
James Robert Gowan (1815–1909), Canadian lawyer, judge, and senator
James Gowan (1923–2015), Scottish architect
John Curtis Gowan (1912–1986), psychologist who studied, along with E. Paul Torrance, the development of creative capabilities in children and gifted populations
Lawrence Gowan (born 1956), Canadian musician
Lee Gowan (born 1961), Canadian novelist
Ogle Robert Gowan (1803–1876), Canadian-Irish politician
Peter Gowan (1946–2009), British academic
Tay Gowan (born 1998), American football player
William Henry Gowan (1884–1957), American sailor

Places
 Gowan Block, built as a commercial building and meeting hall located at 416 Ashmun Street in Sault Ste. Marie, Michigan
 Gowan River, in New Zealand
 River Gowan, Cumbria, a short tributary of the River Kent

Other
 R. v. Gowan, a March 1998 case tried by the Ontario Court of Justice which ruled that, while being topless as form of protest and free speech is legal, being topless while one engages in a commercial purpose such as prostitution is illegal
 Scots language name for any of various yellow or white field flowers, esp. the English daisy

See also
 Ferrario
 Gowans, a surname
 Gowon (disambiguation)
 McGowan, a surname
 Schmidtke
 Schmidt (surname)

Anglicised Scottish Gaelic-language surnames